The NATO Army Armaments Group (NAAG) Integrated Capability Group Indirect Fires (ICGIF), formerly Land Group 4, and their Sub Group 2 (SG2) on Surface to Surface Ballistics has created a widely used set of shareable fire control software using the Ada programming language.  This product is known as the SG2 Shareable (Fire Control) Software Suite (S4) and is sometimes abbreviated as S4 when referenced.

Fire-control system developers and most of the international (primarily NATO) ballistics communities are familiar with the mature NATO Armaments Ballistic Kernel (NABK) and other software component items that have emerged from the NABK development effort. The collection of these software items has been enhanced into the “suite” of NATO shareable fire control software.

Significant development effort occurs in Aberdeen, Maryland, USA in the Firing Tables and Ballistics (FTaB) Division, Armaments Research, Development and Engineering Center (ARDEC) with contributions from a variety of agencies within participating NATO nations.

NATO Standardization Agreements (STANAGS) and Supporting Research
The S4 implements a variety of NATO Standardization Agreements (STANAGs) including STANAG 4355 and STANAG 6022.

A number of papers and presentations have been published, such as a formal description of the early history of the suite and a later presentation in the International Symposium of Ballistics (ISB) forum sponsored by the International Ballistics Society (IBS).

http://www.hsu-hh.de/mit/index_tQ8Jt6q7o77XYTKW.html (S4 testing research and related contributions by Germany)

http://www.hsu-hh.de/mit/index_6ErpEIxUgVmppHGV.html (Crest Clearance algorithm contributions by Germany)

Integrating Weapon Systems

Specific examples include:

Canada
 http://www.artillery.net/beta/wp-content/uploads/2011/08/Vol-26-3-Winter-2011.pdf IFCSS (Page 8, DLR Technical Bulletin)

Denmark
 http://www.a-o-f.dk/PDF/DAT%202009-1.pdf SIF 2000 (Page 23)

France
 http://www.nexter-group.fr/index.php?option=com_content&view=article&id=110%3Alu-211-&catid=50%3Amunitions-dartillerie&Itemid=93&lang=en LU 211 Ammunition

Germany
 Panzerhaubitze 2000
 Artillery Gun Module

Norway
 https://www.kongsberg.com/kda/what-we-do/defence-and-security/c4isr/odin-fire-support-system/ ODIN Fire Support System (ODIN FSS)

Sweden
 http://www.fmv.se/WmTemplates/Page.aspx?id=1378 Archer

Turkey 
 http://www.aselsan.com/content.aspx?mid=375&oid=543 FIRTINA Howitzer Fire Control System
 http://www.aselsan.com/content.aspx?mid=375&oid=498 HAIKS Mortar Fire Direction System
 http://www.aselsan.com/content.aspx?mid=375&oid=497 BAIKS-2000 Battery Fire Direction System
 http://www.aselsan.com/content.aspx?mid=375&oid=542 76 mm. Naval Gun Fire Control System

United Kingdom
 http://www.janes.com/articles/Janes-C4I-Systems/Fire-Control-Application-FCA-United-Kingdom.html FCA
 http://nigelef.tripod.com/fc_computer.htm#NEW_GENERATION FCBISA

United States
 https://ndiastorage.blob.core.usgovcloudapi.net/ndia/2014/armaments/Wed16565_Arnold.pdf AFATDS (Slide 7)

References

External links 
 https://www.aop-37.org (S4 home page)
 http://www.nato.int/cps/en/SID-11879817-AC96E660/natolive/structure.htm (NAAG location within the wider NATO Structures)
NABK BASED NEXT GENERATION BALLISTIC TABLE TOOLKIT, Sevsay Aytar Ortac, Umut Durak, Umit Kutluay, Koray Kucuk, Maj. Can Candan, 23RD INTERNATIONAL SYMPOSIUM ON BALLISTICS, TARRAGONA, SPAIN 16-20 APRIL 2007

Military computers